Qatar (also Romanized as Qaţār) is a village in Baruq Rural District, Baruq District, Miandoab County, West Azerbaijan Province, Iran. At the 2006 census, its population was 818, in 192 families.

References 

Populated places in Miandoab County